Cecilie Thorsteinsen is a Norwegian team handball player.

Thorsteinsen made her debut on the national team in 1994. She played 22 matches and scored 50 goals for the national team from 1994 to 2001. She played for the national team at the 2000 European Women's Handball Championship in Romania, when Norway finished 6th.

References

Year of birth missing (living people)
Living people
Norwegian female handball players